The Czech Ice Hockey Hall of Fame was founded in 2008 and is located in Prague, Czech Republic. The Hall honors individuals that have contributed to the sport of hockey in the Czech Republic.  It houses displays and a collection of memorabilia depicting the significant contributions of players, coaches, referees and other important figures in the sport.

See also
IIHF Hall of Fame

Ice hockey museums and halls of fame
Hall of Fame
Halls of fame in the Czech Republic
Czech ice hockey trophies and awards